Bergamo is a city in Northern Italy.

Bergamo may also refer to:

Places in Italy
Province of Bergamo, a province of Northern Italy
The Republic of Bergamo, a short-lived French client republic in 1797
The Diocese of Bergamo, founded in the 4th century

People
Alexander of Bergamo (†c.303), Roman soldier and patron saint of Bergamo
Viator of Bergamo (died 370), second bishop of Bergam
Andreas of Bergamo, late-ninth-century Italian historian
Bonagratia of Bergamo (c. 1265 – 1340), Franciscan lawyer
Venturino of Bergamo (1304–1346), Italian preacher
Gasparinus de Bergamo (c. 1360 – c. 1431), Italian grammarian
Peter of Bergamo (died 1482), Italian theologian
Giacomo da Bergamo (1434–1520), Augustinian monk
Padre Davide da Bergamo (1791–1863), Italian monk and composer

Other uses
Bergamo (surname)
Bergamo (shopping mall), a shopping mall in Chennai, India
The 15 Infantry Division Bergamo, an Infantry Division of the Italian Army during World War II
The University of Bergamo
The Bergamo railway station
Atalanta Bergamo, the Bergamo football club
The Bergamo Lions, an Italian American football team
Volley Bergamo, the volleyball team of Bergamo

See also 
Bergama, a Turkish city and district
Bergamot (disambiguation)